Jack and Dil is a Bollywood romantic comedy film, starring Amit Sadh, Sonal Chauhan, Arbaaz Khan and Evelyn Sharma in lead roles. The film is written by Sanjeev Dutta and directed by Sachin P Karande. This film is being produced by Balcony Films and Entertainment.

Plot 
Earning as much to meet his daily needs, Jack (Amit Sadh), a comical detective is hired by Waliaji (Arbaaz Khan) to spy on his wife Shilpa (Sonal Chauhan) when he suspects her of having an affair. Things go upside down when Jack ends up falling in love with his client's wife.

Cast 
 Amit Sadh as Jack
 Arbaaz Khan as KK Walia
 Sonal Chauhan as Shilpa Walia
 Evelyn Sharma as Lara
 Rajdeep Choudhury as Mystery Man
 Godaan Kumar as Seller

Reception 
Sukanya Verma of Rediff.com gave the film 1 out of 5 stars and stated, "Between Sadh's feelings for a dog, two girls and man he may or may not help reconcile with his wife, Jack and Dil feels like a marathon to nowhere. It's not funny when it ends with one." Pallabi Dey Purkayastha of Times of India gave the film 1.5 stars out 5 and stated, "Unless these three reasonably good artistes have big debts to clear, I don’t see a reason as to why anyone in their right minds would say yes to a chaotic rom-com like ‘Jack & Dil’." Troy Ribeiro of News18 gave the film 2 out of 5 stars and stated, "The plot is clumsy and characters superficial with cardboard thin arcs. Arbaaz Khan's film is a sheer waste of time." Devesh Sharma of Filmfare gave the film 2 out of 5 stars and stated, "The cinematography, editing, even music are strictly average fare. The writing is in total shambles."

Soundtrack

The album is composed by Arko Pravo Mukherjee, Argya Banarjee and Ramji Gulati while the lyrics penned by Vayu, Bipin Das, Ramji-Mack and Arafat Mehmood.

References

External links

 

2010s Hindi-language films
2018 films
Indian romantic comedy films
2018 romantic comedy films